Sandeep Yadav may refer to:

Sandeep Yadav (actor)
 Sandeep Yadav (cricketer)
 Sandeep Yadav (politician)